Stephen Gugel Doig (born March 28, 1960) is a former professional American football player who played in the National Football League for the Detroit Lions (1982–1984) and the New England Patriots ( 1986–1987)
He was a 3rd round selection (69th overall) of the 1982 NFL Draft by the Detroit Lions out of the University of New Hampshire. While attending North Reading High School, he was also a hockey player.

Doig was the ECAC Player of the Year and Yankee Conference Player of the Year.  He was the Defensive Captain in the Blue–Gray Bowl. He played in nine games for the Detroit Lions in 1982 and in nine games in 1983.  Steve had 17 solo tackles and 2 assists in sixteen games for the Detroit Lions in 1984. He did not play professional football in 1985.

Doig was signed as a free agent by the New England Patriots in 1986 and played in five games, recorded 1 solo tackle and recovered a fumble by Andra Franklin on his kickoff return in the Patriots' 34-27 win over the Miami Dolphins on December 22, 1986.
He played in one regular season game for the New England Patriots in the 1987 season and in their playoff game on January 4, 1987. He wore uniform # 59 for the New England Patriots.

References

1960 births
Living people
People from Melrose, Massachusetts
Sportspeople from Middlesex County, Massachusetts
Players of American football from Massachusetts
American football linebackers
New Hampshire Wildcats football players
Detroit Lions players
New England Patriots players